Martín Romero El Rápido is a 1966 Mexican western film. It stars Fernando Casanova.

Cast
Fernando Casanova as Martín Romero
Armando Silvestre as El Cuervo
María Duval as Andrea Garza
Ofelia Montesco as Rosita
Armando Soto La Marina as Pinole
Víctor Alcocer as Artemio Velasco

External links
 

1966 films
Mexican Western (genre) films
1960s Spanish-language films
1960s Mexican films